In mathematics, preconditioning is the application of a transformation, called the preconditioner,  that conditions a given problem into a form that is more suitable for numerical solving methods. Preconditioning is typically related to reducing a condition number of the problem. The preconditioned problem is then usually solved by an iterative method.

Preconditioning for linear systems 

Preconditioners are useful in iterative methods to solve a linear system   for  since the rate of convergence for most iterative linear solvers increases because the condition number of a matrix decreases as a result of preconditioning. Preconditioned iterative solvers typically outperform direct solvers, e.g., Gaussian elimination, for large, especially for sparse, matrices. Iterative solvers can be used as matrix-free methods, i.e. become the only choice if the coefficient matrix  is not stored explicitly, but is accessed by evaluating matrix-vector products.

Description 

 

and solve

 

 

Alternatively, one may solve the left preconditioned system

 

Both systems give the same solution as the original system as long as the preconditioner matrix  is nonsingular. The left preconditioning is more traditional.

The two-sided preconditioned system

 

may be beneficial, e.g., to preserve the matrix symmetry: if the original matrix  is real symmetric and real preconditioners  and  satisfy   then the preconditioned matrix  is also symmetric.

Small condition numbers benefit fast convergence of iterative solvers and improve stability of the solution with respect to perturbations in the system matrix and the right-hand side, e.g., allowing for more aggressive quantization of the matrix entries using lower computer precision.

Only the action of applying the preconditioner solve operation   to a given vector may need to be computed.

Since the operator  must be applied at each step of the iterative linear solver, it should have a small cost (computing time) of applying the   operation. The cheapest preconditioner would therefore be  since then  Clearly, this results in the original linear system and the preconditioner does nothing. At the other extreme, the choice   gives  which has optimal condition number of 1, requiring a single iteration for convergence; however in this case  and applying the preconditioner is as difficult as solving the original system. One therefore chooses    as somewhere between these two extremes, in an attempt to achieve a minimal number of linear iterations while keeping the operator    as simple as possible. Some examples of typical preconditioning approaches are detailed below.

Preconditioned iterative methods

Applied to the preconditioned system  it turns into a preconditioned method

Examples of popular preconditioned iterative methods for linear systems include the preconditioned conjugate gradient method, the biconjugate gradient method, and generalized minimal residual method. Iterative methods, which use scalar products to compute the iterative parameters, require corresponding changes in the scalar product together with substituting  for

Matrix splitting 
A stationary iterative method is determined by the matrix splitting  and the iteration matrix . Assuming that
 the system matrix  is symmetric positive-definite,
 the splitting matrix  is symmetric positive-definite,
the condition number  is bounded above by

Geometric interpretation
For a symmetric positive definite matrix  the preconditioner  is typically chosen to be symmetric positive definite as well. The preconditioned operator  is then also symmetric positive definite, but with respect to the -based scalar product. In this case, the desired effect in applying a preconditioner is to make the quadratic form of the preconditioned operator  with respect to the -based scalar product to be nearly spherical.

Variable and non-linear preconditioning 
Typical examples involve using non-linear iterative methods, e.g., the conjugate gradient method, as a part of the preconditioner construction. Such preconditioners may be practically very efficient, however, their behavior is hard to predict theoretically.

Random preconditioning 
One interesting particular case of variable preconditioning is random preconditioning, e.g., multigrid preconditioning on random course grids. If used in gradient descent methods, random preconditioning can be viewed as an implementation of stochastic gradient descent and can lead to faster convergence, compared to fixed preconditioning, since it breaks the asymptotic "zig-zag" pattern of the gradient descent.

Spectrally equivalent preconditioning
The most common use of preconditioning is for iterative solution of linear systems resulting from approximations of partial differential equations. The better the approximation quality, the larger the matrix size is.

Examples

Jacobi (or diagonal) preconditioner
The Jacobi preconditioner is one of the simplest forms of preconditioning, in which the preconditioner is chosen to be the diagonal of the matrix  Assuming , we get  It is efficient for diagonally dominant matrices . It is used in analysis softwares for beam problems or 1-D problems (EX:- STAAD PRO)

SPAI
Under the Frobenius norm, this reduces to solving numerous independent least-squares problems (one for every column). The method was introduced by M.J. Grote and T. Huckle together with an approach to selecting sparsity patterns.

Other preconditioners 
 Incomplete Cholesky factorization
 Incomplete LU factorization
 Successive over-relaxation
 Symmetric successive over-relaxation
 Multigrid preconditioning

External links
 Preconditioned Conjugate Gradient – math-linux.com
 Templates for the Solution of Linear Systems: Building Blocks for Iterative Methods

Preconditioning for eigenvalue problems 
Eigenvalue problems can be framed in several alternative ways, each leading to its own preconditioning. The traditional preconditioning is based on the so-called spectral transformations. Knowing (approximately) the targeted eigenvalue, one can compute the corresponding eigenvector by solving the related homogeneous linear system, thus allowing to use preconditioning for linear system. Finally, formulating the eigenvalue problem as optimization of the Rayleigh quotient brings preconditioned optimization techniques to the scene.

Spectral transformations
By analogy with linear systems, for an eigenvalue problem  one may be tempted to replace the matrix  with the matrix  using a preconditioner . This is the case for spectral transformations.

The most popular spectral transformation is the so-called shift-and-invert transformation, where for a given scalar , called the shift, the original eigenvalue problem  is replaced with the shift-and-invert problem . The eigenvectors are preserved, and one can solve the shift-and-invert problem by an iterative solver, e.g., the power iteration. This gives the Inverse iteration, which normally converges to the eigenvector, corresponding to the eigenvalue closest to the shift . The Rayleigh quotient iteration is a shift-and-invert method with a variable shift.

Spectral transformations are specific for eigenvalue problems and have no analogs for linear systems. They require accurate numerical calculation of the transformation involved, which becomes the main bottleneck for large problems.

General preconditioning
To make a close connection to linear systems, let us suppose that the targeted eigenvalue  is known (approximately). Then one can compute the corresponding eigenvector from the homogeneous linear system . Using the concept of left preconditioning for linear systems, we obtain , where   is the preconditioner, which we can try to solve using the Richardson iteration

The ideal preconditioning
The choice   is impractical for three independent reasons. First,  is actually not known, although it can be replaced with its approximation . Second, the exact Moore–Penrose pseudoinverse requires the knowledge of the eigenvector, which we are trying to find. This can be somewhat circumvented by the use of the Jacobi–Davidson preconditioner , where  approximates . Last, but not least, this approach requires accurate numerical solution of linear system with the system matrix , which becomes as expensive for large problems as the shift-and-invert method above. If the solution is not accurate enough, step two may be redundant.

Practical preconditioning
Let us first replace the theoretical value  in the Richardson iteration above with its current approximation  to obtain a practical algorithm

A popular choice is  using the Rayleigh quotient function . Practical preconditioning may be as trivial as just using  or  For some classes of eigenvalue problems the efficiency of  has been demonstrated, both numerically and theoretically. The choice  allows one to easily utilize for eigenvalue problems the vast variety of preconditioners developed for linear systems.

Due to the changing value , a comprehensive theoretical convergence analysis is much more difficult, compared to the linear systems case, even for the simplest methods, such as the Richardson iteration.

External links
 Templates for the Solution of Algebraic Eigenvalue Problems: a Practical Guide

Preconditioning in optimization 

In optimization, preconditioning is typically used to accelerate first-order optimization algorithms.

Description 
For example, to find a local minimum of a real-valued function  using gradient descent, one takes steps proportional to the negative of the gradient   (or of the approximate gradient) of the function at the current point:

The preconditioner is applied to the gradient:

Preconditioning here can be viewed as changing the geometry of the vector space with the goal to make the level sets look like circles. In this case the preconditioned gradient aims closer to the point of the extrema as on the figure, which speeds up the convergence.

Connection to linear systems
The minimum of a quadratic function

,

Since , the preconditioned gradient descent method of minimizing   is

This is the preconditioned Richardson iteration for solving a system of linear equations.

Connection to eigenvalue problems

The minimum of the Rayleigh quotient

This is an analog of preconditioned Richardson iteration for solving eigenvalue problems.

Variable preconditioning 
In many cases, it may be beneficial to change the preconditioner at some or even every step of an iterative algorithm in order to accommodate for a changing shape of the level sets, as in

One should have in mind, however, that constructing an efficient preconditioner is very often computationally expensive. The increased cost of updating the preconditioner can easily override the positive effect of faster convergence.

References

Sources

 Ke Chen: "Matrix Preconditioning Techniques and Applications", Cambridge University Press,  (2005).

Numerical linear algebra